Zagatala PFK is an Azerbaijani football club based in Zaqatala.

History 
The club was founded in 2015 and participates in the Azerbaijan First Division.

League and Cup

Stadium

Zaqatala City Stadium is a football stadium in Zagatala.  It is currently used as the club's home stadium and holds 3,500 people.

Current squad

(captain)

Managers
 Shaban Shirdanov (2015–2017)
 Ilgar Aslanli (2017)
 Rustam Mammadov (2018–)

References

Weblinks
 PFL

Football clubs in Azerbaijan
Association football clubs established in 2015
2015 establishments in Azerbaijan